Herbert Mermagen noted x-ray pioneer and medical physicist was born on 19 April 1907 and died at the age of 73 in Rochester, New York in January 1981.

Select publications
 Evaluation of a rem responding neutron detector for use around the University of Rochester's 20 MeV Emperor Tandem Van De Graaff Accelerator

References

1907 births
1981 deaths
20th-century American physicists
Health physicists
Medical physicists
Health Physics Society